Shuja Khan was governor of Multan. He was father of Nawab Muzaffar Khan. Nawab Shuja Khan, the second son of Nawab Zahid Khan, who was twice remained the governor (Subedar) of Multan under Ahmed Shah Durrani's rule. Nawab Shuja Khan founded the Shujabad town in 1750 and built the fortification wall between 1767 and 1772. Nawab Shuja Khan died in 1775 AD. He was  buried outside Basti Khairpur.

References 

1775 deaths
Year of birth missing
Pashtun people
Pashtun dynasties
Durrani dynasty
History of Multan
Emirs of Afghanistan
Afghan expatriates in Pakistan
18th-century Afghan people